Saint Patrick Street (officially in French: Rue Saint-Patrick) is a street in Montreal, Quebec, Canada.

It begins at the Chemin du Musée, an extension of LaSalle Boulevard, at the canal's western entrance in the borough of Lachine, west of which it becomes the Chemin du Canal and runs along the spit of land that forms René Lévesque Park. Proceeding eastward from here, it traverses the boroughs of Lachine and LaSalle, then the neighbourhoods of Ville-Émard, Côte-Saint-Paul, and Pointe-Saint-Charles in Le Sud-Ouest, ending at Wellington Street beside the Wellington and Peel Basins on the Saint Lawrence River.

History

The street is named for Saint Patrick, the patron saint of Ireland, and has one of many Irish-inspired street names in Pointe-Saint-Charles, which along with neighbouring Griffintown was the traditional home of Montreal's Irish community. The Pointe-Saint-Charles portion of the street is the original, with a map from 1859 showing the street terminating at the Canadian Pacific Railway crossing in this district; it was later extended westward.

Features

The street is mainly industrial, especially in its western sections between René-Lévesque Park and Autoroute 15. Redpath Sugar formerly operated a sugar refinery at 1396 Saint Patrick Street in Pointe-Saint-Charles. The street also contains residential portions, including in Ville-Émard.

A bicycle path runs along the Lachine Canal parallel to this street. This path also continues eastward past Wellington Street, turning north to meet the Bonaventure Expressway and Old Port. Bicycle rentals are available at the Ma Bicyclette shops at the corner of Rue Thomas-Keefer, near the Atwater Market.

References

Streets in Montreal
Lachine, Quebec
LaSalle, Quebec
Le Sud-Ouest
Irish-Canadian culture in Montreal